Observer effect, observer bias, observation bias, etc. may refer to a number of concepts, some of them closely related:

General experimental biases 
 Hawthorne effect, a form of reactivity in which subjects modify an aspect of their behavior, in response to their knowing that they are being studied
 Observer-expectancy effect, a form of reactivity in which a researcher's cognitive bias causes them to unconsciously influence the participants of an experiment
 Observer bias, a detection bias in research studies resulting for example from an observer's cognitive biases

Physics 
 Observer effect (physics), the impact of observing a physical system
 Probe effect, the effect on a physical system of adding measurement devices, such as the probes of electronic test equipment

Computing 
 Heisenbug of computer programming, in which a software bug seems to disappear or alter its behavior when one attempts to study it
 Observer effect (information technology), the impact of observing a process while it is running

Media 
 "Observer Effect" (Star Trek: Enterprise), an episode of Star Trek: Enterprise, named after the effect in physics.

See also 
 Actor–observer bias
 Demonstration effect
 Uncertainty principle
 Meditation
 Personal equation, in experimental science
 Schrödinger's cat, a thought experiment, often described as a paradox, devised by Austrian physicist Erwin Schrödinger